Tekin may refer to:

Given name
 Tekin Alp, Turkish politician
 Tekin Arıburun, Turkish soldier and statesman
 Tekin Bingöl, Turkish politician
 Tekin Dereli, Turkish theoretical physicist
 Tekin Kurtuluş, German actor
 Tekin Okan Düzgün (born 1988), Turkish Paralympian goalball player
 Tekin Sazlog, Turkish footballer

Surname
 Bülent Tekin, Kurdish poet and writer
 Gürsel Tekin, Turkish politician
 Harun Tekin, Turkish singer
 Latife Tekin, Turkish women writer
 Metin Tekin, retired Turkish footballer
 Özlem Tekin, Turkish singer
 Türker Tekin, Turkish theater director and actor

Turkish-language surnames
Turkish masculine given names